Gregory Dimitri Gadson (born February 19, 1966) is an American actor, motivational speaker, retired colonel in the United States Army and former commander of the U.S. Army Fort Belvoir garrison. He is also a bilateral above-the-knee amputee. He served in the U.S. Army for more than 20 years as a field artillery officer and served on active duty for Operations Desert Shield and Desert Storm, Operation Joint Forge, Operation Enduring Freedom, and Operation Iraqi Freedom.

Education and military career
Gadson attended the United States Military Academy at West Point, New York, graduating in 1989. He also holds a master's degree in information systems from Webster University and a master's degree in policy management from Georgetown University. He is a graduate of the Command and General Staff College and the Advanced Field Artillery Officers Course and in 2010, he became an Army War College Fellow at the Institute of World Politics in Washington, D.C.

Assignments
 Commander, U.S. Army Garrison, Fort Belvoir, Virginia
 Director, Army Wounded Warrior Program, Alexandria, Virginia
 2nd Battalion, 32nd Field Artillery.
 4th Infantry Brigade Combat Team, 1st Infantry Division (Fort Riley).
 Battalion fire direction officer for 5th Battalion, 18th Field Artillery, III Corps at Fort Sill.
 Division targeting officer, Headquarters and Headquarters Battery, 82nd Airborne Division Artillery.
 Battalion adjutant, 3rd Battalion, 319th Airborne Field Artillery Regiment.
 Battalion fire support officer, 1st Battalion, 504th Parachute Infantry Regiment.
 Commander, Battery C, 3rd Battalion, 319th Airborne Field Artillery Regiment.
 Commander, Headquarters and Headquarters Company, 82nd Airborne Division for the 82nd Airborne Division at Fort Bragg.
 Personnel distribution officer and human resources commander, Alexandria, Virginia.
 Battalion operations officer, 2nd Battalion, 11th Field Artillery.
 Operations officer, 25th Infantry Division, executive officer.
 Special assistant to the commanding general, United States Army Pacific at Fort Shafter.

Deployments
 Platoon fire direction officer, firing battery platoon leader (Desert Shield/Desert Storm)
 Chief of operations, Multinational Division North, Bosnia-Herzegovina, (Stabilization Force XI), 25th Infantry Division (Light)
 25th Infantry Division Artillery, Forward Operating Base Salerno, Afghanistan (Operation Enduring Freedom V)

Injury
On the night of May 7, 2007, while returning from a memorial service for two soldiers from his brigade, he lost both his legs and severely injured his right arm to a roadside bomb in Baghdad.  He became one of the first military personnel to use a next-generation powered prosthetic knee with technology to make it possible for amputees to walk with confidence and with a more natural gait.

Military awards

Gadson is also authorized to wear the Combat Action Badge and the Master Parachutist Badge.

Civil awards
He won the prestigious Henry Viscardi Achievement Awards in 2017 given by Viscardi center to honour the extraordinary leaders with disabilities.

Athletics
Gadson played football at West Point between 1985 and 1988, wearing the No. 98 jersey.  In 2007, he was present when the New York Giants beat the Washington Redskins at FedExField at the invitation of West Point classmate Mike Sullivan, who was then on the coaching staff of the New York Giants.  This win was the beginning of a 10-game road winning streak and came after Gadson had made an inspirational speech to the team. The streak culminated in the Giants winning Super Bowl XLII.  and in recognition for his contribution, Gadson received a specially minted Super Bowl ring. Gadson has since remained with the team as a motivational speaker.

Acting career
Gadson made his acting debut in Battleship, a 2012 American science fiction naval war film, as Lieutenant Colonel Mick Canales, playing a war veteran who regains his appetite for the fight when Oahu is threatened by an alien attack. Director Peter Berg, having seen news articles about Gadson, decided to cast him as an army officer trying to recover from the loss of his legs. 
2023 appeared on NCIS Los Angeles series 14 Ep2 Of Value.

Photography
Gadson has been an avid photographer for many years. His work has most recently been featured prominently in Coming Home: Journey, Community, Dialog, a public art project based in New York City that seeks to encourage communication between civilians and those who have served in the US military.

Filmography
 Battleship (2012) – Lieutenant Colonel Mick Canales
 The Inspectors (2015–2016) – David Cole (10 episodes)
 NCIS: Los Angeles (2022) - Col. Jackson Ladd (1 episode)
"A Journal for Jordan" (2021)
Uncredited

References

External links

 
 West Point Class of 1989

1966 births
Living people
American amputees
United States Army colonels
United States Army personnel of the Iraq War
United States Army personnel of the Gulf War
United States Army personnel of the War in Afghanistan (2001–2021)
Recipients of the Legion of Merit
United States Military Academy alumni
People from Chesapeake, Virginia
American male film actors
21st-century American male actors
Male actors from Virginia
Military personnel from Virginia
20th-century American male actors
Army Black Knights football players